Toni Mudrack (born 8 December 1990), better known by his stage name Teesy, is a German singer, songwriter and rapper.

Discography

Studio albums

References

External links

 

1990 births
Living people
German male singers
German pop singers
German singer-songwriters
German rappers
Participants in the Bundesvision Song Contest
Musicians from Berlin